is a Japanese footballer who plays for J2 League club Júbilo Iwata. His brother Akihiro Endō is a former footballer.

He made his senior international debut in 2002, representing Japan in three World Cups and three Confederations Cups. In the process he earned over 150 caps, scoring 15 goals and becoming the most capped Japanese male player of all time. He is also one of the few players to have made over 1,100 official appearances.

Club career 
Endō was born in Kagoshima on 28 January 1980. In March, he debuted against Yokohama Marinos in the opening game of the 1998 season. Largely as a central midfielder, he helped his club win the championship in the 1998 Emperor's Cup. Due to financial strain, the club was disbanded at the end of the season.

In 1999, Endō moved to Kyoto Purple Sanga with contemporaries Kazuki Teshima and Hideo Oshima. He became a regular player and played many matches. However the club was relegated to J2 League at the end of the 2000 season.

In 2001, Endō moved to J1 club Gamba Osaka. He was a central player for the club for a long time under manager Akira Nishino (2002–2011). He was selected as a J.League Best Eleven 10 years in a row (2003–2012). In 2005, Gamba won the championship in J1 League for the first time in club history. In 2008, Gamba won the championship in AFC Champions League for 2 years in a row as Japanese club (Urawa Reds won in 2007). Gamba also won the Emperor's Cup. Endō was selected "Japanese Footballer of the Year". In 2009, Gamba won the Emperor's Cup for 2 years in a row. Endō was selected Asian Footballer of the Year.

Manager Nishino left Gamba after the 2011 season and the club's performance deteriorated. In 2012, Gamba finished at the 17th place of 18 clubs and was relegated to J2 League. Endō remained with Gamba and Gamba won the champions in 2013 season. In 2014 season, Gamba returned to J1 and won all three major title in Japan, J1 League, J.League Cup and Emperor's Cup. Endō was selected J.League MVP first time and "Japanese Footballer of the Year" second time.

In October 2020, he joined J2 League side Júbilo Iwata on loan from Gamba Osaka.

In December 2021, he joined Júbilo Iwata on a full transfer.

International career 
Endō played in the 1999 World Youth Championship and Japan finished as runner-up, losing to Spain in the final. Since 2002, Endō has been a member of the Japan national team, and was selected for Japan's 2006, 2010 and 2014 World Cup squads. He also was a member of the 2004 and 2011 Asian Cup winning teams.

On 24 June 2010, Endō scored from a free-kick against Denmark in a 3–1 win as Japan qualified for the second round of the World Cup.

On 12 October 2010, he became the fourth player to earn 100th full international cap for Japan in a friendly match against South Korea. On 16 October 2012, Endō became Japan's most capped player in a friendly against Brazil. His start in this match was his 123rd appearance for the national team, surpassing Masami Ihara's previous record of 122 caps.

Endō was included on Japan's squad for the 2015 Asian Cup and scored the team's opening goal of the tournament in a 4–0 defeat of Palestine. In the team's next match, he earned his 150th cap as Japan defeated Iraq 1–0. He played 152 games and scored 15 goals for Japan until 2015.

Style of play 
He is considered a cult hero among fans of Gamba Osaka and the Japan national team. It is because he has formidable passing ability, leadership, and goal scoring ability. He is also known for his excellent accuracy on free kicks and is revered as one of Japan's most creative midfielders as well as one of the most talented Japanese footballers and playmakers of his generation, despite only playing domestically in his home country.

Career statistics

Club

International 

Scores and results list Japan's goal tally first, score column indicates score after each Endō goal.

Honours 
Yokohama Flügels
Emperor's Cup: 1998

Gamba Osaka
J1 League: 2005, 2014
J2 League: 2013
Emperor's Cup: 2008, 2009, 2014, 2015
J.League Cup: 2007, 2014
Japanese Super Cup: 2007, 2015
AFC Champions League: 2008
Pan-Pacific Championship: 2008
FIFA Club World Cup: 2008 Bronze Medalist.

Júbilo Iwata
J2 League: 2021

Japan
AFC Asian Cup: 2004, 2011
Afro-Asian Cup of Nations: 2007
Kirin Cup: 2004, 2007, 2008, 2009

Individual
 Asian Footballer of the Year: 2009
 AFC Champions League Best Player: 2008
 J.League MVP Award: 2014
 Japanese Footballer of the Year: 2008, 2014
 J.League Best Eleven: 2003, 2004, 2005, 2006, 2007, 2008, 2009, 2010, 2011, 2012, 2014, 2015
 J.League 20th Anniversary Team

See also 
 List of men's footballers with 100 or more international caps
 List of men's footballers with the most official appearances

References

External links 

Japan National Football Team Database

Profile at Gamba Osaka

1980 births
Living people
Association football people from Kagoshima Prefecture
Japanese footballers
Japan youth international footballers
Japan international footballers
J1 League players
J2 League players
Yokohama Flügels players
Kyoto Sanga FC players
Gamba Osaka players
Júbilo Iwata players
2003 FIFA Confederations Cup players
2004 AFC Asian Cup players
2005 FIFA Confederations Cup players
2006 FIFA World Cup players
2007 AFC Asian Cup players
2010 FIFA World Cup players
2011 AFC Asian Cup players
2013 FIFA Confederations Cup players
2014 FIFA World Cup players
2015 AFC Asian Cup players
AFC Asian Cup-winning players
FIFA Century Club
Asian Footballer of the Year winners
J1 League Player of the Year winners
Association football midfielders
People from Kagoshima